The region-beta paradox is the phenomenon that people can sometimes recover more quickly from more distressing experiences than from less distressing ones. The hypothesized reason is that intense states trigger psychological defense processes that reduce the distress, while less intense states do not trigger the same psychological defense processes and, therefore, less effective attenuation of the stress occurs. However, people typically predict intense states to last longer.

The paradox has been observed in the psychological effects of exposure to terrorist attacks. This is likely related to activation of coping, cognitive dissonance and other forms of mental mobilization.

It has been computationally modelled in an affective computing model.

Examples
If someone is currently in a mediocre romantic relationship, they will be less likely to end it to find an excellent relationship than if their current relationship was worse, thus making their current overall situation worse. The same would be true if they were in a mediocre job.

Origin of name
The name originates from the illustration in the paper by Daniel Gilbert et al. that introduced the paradox. They consider a commuter who has the habit of walking to destinations within a mile of their origin, and biking to more distant destinations. Since the bike is faster the commuter will reach some distant locations more quickly than nearer destinations (region beta in their diagram), reversing the normal tendency to arrive later at more distant locations.

This non-monotonicity applies to states where interventions can be chosen, but are not chosen below certain thresholds (because of cost etc.). For example, injured people may be more likely to seek out effective means to speed their recovery (taking medicine, going to a doctor, undergoing surgery) when the injury is more severe than for mild injuries, making the lesser injuries last longer.

See also
 Affective forecasting
 Cognitive dissonance
 List of paradoxes: psychology

References

Emotion
Cognitive biases
Paradoxes